The 1989–90 UEFA Cup was won by Juventus on aggregate over Fiorentina. This was the first final between two Italian sides in the UEFA competitions history and the third between two clubs of the same country.

It was the last season for which English clubs were banned from European competitions, as sequel to the Heysel disaster in May 1985. The English clubs who missed out of this season of the competition were Nottingham Forest and Norwich City.

Preliminary round
France and Yugoslavia had exactly the same UEFA ranking, so they played a special match to obtain one of the two English places.

|}

First leg

Second leg

Auxerre won 3–2 on aggregate.

First round

|}

First leg

Second leg

The match was abandoned in the 104th minute with the score at 1–1 after Austria Wien's goalkeeper Franz Wohlfahrt was struck by an iron rod thrown from the home stand. As a result, Ajax had to concede the match by default and were excluded from competing in European football for a year. Austria Wien won 4–0 on aggregate.

Antwerp won 4–3 on aggregate.

Zaragoza won 4–1 on aggregate.

2–2 on aggregate; Rapid Wien won on away goals.

Hibernian won 4–0 on aggregate.

 1–1 on aggregate; Fiorentina won 3–1 on penalties.

Valencia won 4–2 on aggregate.

Paris Saint-Germain won 3–2 on aggregate.

RoPS won 2–1 on aggregate.

Auxerre won 8–0 on aggregate.

Sochaux won 12–0 on aggregate.

Sion won 2–1 on aggregate.

Dundee United won 5–1 on aggregate.

RFC Liège won 6–1 on aggregate.

Spartak Moscow won 2–0 on aggregate.

First Vienna won 7–1 on aggregate.

Werder Bremen won 5–1 on aggregate.

Club Brugge won 4–1 on aggregate.

Juventus won 5–2 on aggregate.

0–0 on aggregate; Napoli won 4–3 on penalties.

Porto won 4–1 on aggregate.

Köln won 5–1 on aggregate.

Stuttgart won 3–2 on aggregate.

Hamburg won 7–2 on aggregate.

Wettingen won 5–0 on aggregate.

Red Star Belgrade won 3–1 on aggregate.

Dynamo Kyiv won 6–1 on aggregate.

Zenit Leningrad won 3–1 on aggregate.

Žalgiris Vilnius won 2–1 on aggregate.

Olympiacos won 3–2 on aggregate.

Karl-Marx-Stadt won 3–2 on aggregate.

Baník Ostrava won 7–2 on aggregate.

Second round

|}

First leg

Second leg

3–3 on aggregate; Olympiacos won on away goals.

Antwerp won 6–3 on aggregate.

Rapid Wien won 6–4 on aggregate.

RFC Liège won 1–0 on aggregate.

Hamburg won 2–1 on aggregate.

Auxerre won 8–0 on aggregate.

Juventus won 3–1 on aggregate.

1–1 on aggregate; Fiorentina won on away goals.

Porto won 5–4 on aggregate.

Werder Bremen won 5–2 on aggregate.

Köln won 3–1 on aggregate.

Karl-Marx-Stadt won 5–3 on aggregate.

Napoli won 2–1 on aggregate.

Dynamo Kyiv won 4–1 on aggregate.

Stuttgart won 6–0 on aggregate.

Red Star Belgrade won 5–1 on aggregate.

Third round

|}

First leg

Second leg

Antwerp won 2–1 on aggregate.

RFC Liège won 3–2 on aggregate.

1–1 on aggregate; Auxerre won on away goals.

Fiorentina won 1–0 on aggregate.

Werder Bremen won 8–3 on aggregate.

Juventus won 3–1 on aggregate.

2–2 on aggregate; Hamburg won on away goals.

Köln won 3–2 on aggregate.

Quarter-finals

|}

First leg

Second leg

Werder Bremen won 4–3 on aggregate.

Fiorentina won 2–0 on aggregate.

Köln won 2–0 on aggregate.

Juventus won 3–2 on aggregate.

Semi-finals

|}

First leg

Second leg

1–1 on aggregate; Fiorentina won on away goals.

Juventus won 3–2 on aggregate.

Final

First leg

Second leg

Juventus won 3–1 on aggregate.

Notes

External links
 Official UEFA Website

UEFA Cup seasons
2